Tiler is a surname. Notable people with the surname include:

 Brian Tiler (1943–1990), English footballer
 Carl Tiler (born 1970), English footballer
 Ken Tiler (born 1950), English footballer
 Rebekah Tiler (born 1999), British weightlifter 
 William Tiler (fl. 1406–1407), English politician

Other uses
 Tiler Peck (born 1989), American ballet dancer

See also
 Tile, a floor, roof or wall covering
 Tiler (Masonic)
 Tyler (surname)